The oak titmouse (Baeolophus inornatus) is a passerine bird in the tit family Paridae. The American Ornithologists' Union split the plain titmouse into the oak titmouse and the juniper titmouse in 1996, due to distinct differences in song, preferred habitat, and genetic makeup.

The oak titmouse is a small, brown-tinged gray bird with small tuft or crest. The face is plain, and the undersides are a lighter gray. Sexes are similar, as there is very little to no sexual dimorphism.

This species lives year-round on the Pacific slope, resident from southern Oregon south through California west of the Sierra Nevada to Baja California, but its range surrounds the central San Joaquin Valley. It prefers open woodlands of warm, dry oak and oak-pine at low to mid-elevations but can also be found in forests as long as adequate oak trees are present.

The oak titmouse will sleep in cavities, dense foliage or birdhouses. When roosting in foliage, the titmouse chooses a twig surrounded by dense foliage or an accumulation of dead pine needles, simulating a roost in a cavity. It forms pairs or small groups, but does not form large flocks. It may join mixed-species flocks after breeding season for foraging. Pairs stay together after the breeding season.

Oak titmice eat insects and spiders, and are sometimes seen catching insects in mid air. They will also take berries, acorns, and some seeds. This species forages on foliage, twigs, branches, trunks, and occasionally on ground, sometimes hanging upside down to forage, and hammering seeds against branches to open them. Oak titmice are attracted to feeders with suet, peanut butter and sunflower seeds.

The song of the oak titmouse is a series of repeated phrases of two or three notes with the last note of lower pitch; usually three to seven phrases are grouped together. The call is a scratchy tsicka-dee-dee.

The oak titmouse builds its nest in a woodpecker hole, a natural cavity, or a nest box, using grass, moss, mud, hair, feathers, and fur. It breeds from March into July, with peak activity in April and May, laying 3–9 eggs, usually 6–8. The female is the primary incubator, with incubation taking 14–16 days. Young are altricial and are tended by both parents in nest for 16–21 days. Parents continue to tend to young for another three to four weeks after they leave the nest.

The oak titmouse and juniper titmouse appear almost identical, but differ in voice as well as range. The oak titmouse has a browner back than the juniper titmouse. The oak titmouse gives a repeated series of three to seven syllables, each comprising one low and one high note, while the juniper titmouse song consists of a series of rapid syllables on the same note. Ranges overlap only in a small area in California. The tufted titmouse, which does not overlap in range, has a whiter belly, rusty flanks, and black on the forehead.

References

Further reading

External links

 Oak titmouse Species Account – Cornell Lab of Ornithology
 Oak titmouse at Audubon.org
 
 
 
 
 
 

oak titmouse
Native birds of the Western United States
Birds of Mexico
Fauna of the California chaparral and woodlands
oak titmouse
oak titmouse